The following television stations in the United States brand as channel 7 (though neither using virtual channel 7 nor broadcasting on physical RF channel 7):
 KNSD in San Diego, California
 KTGM in Tamuning, Guam
 WDAY-DT2 in Fargo, North Dakota
 WPTA-DT2 in Fort Wayne, Indiana
 WWMT-DT2 in Kalamazoo, Michigan
 WWSB in Sarasota, Florida
 WZVN-TV in Naples, Florida

The following television stations in the United States formerly branded as channel 7:
 WPTA-DT2 in Fort Wayne, Indiana

07 branded